is a Japanese fashion model and actress. She is represented with Anoré. Her ex-husband is actor Ryuhei Matsuda.

Biography
In 2001, Ōta won the Grand Prix along with Yui Aragaki at the 4th Reader Model Audition of the magazine Nicola. After that while modelling with Nicola, she appeared in other magazines and media. For her publications other than her model participation, Ōta collaborated with the fashion brand Pou Dou Dou, and served as the editor-in-chief of hotikiss, as well as the photograph collection hotikiss (both previsions).

She has appeared in many television advertisements for products such as Shiseido, Sony and Aohata (Kewpie). In one case, Ōta appeared in an advert for Ezaki Glico's Water Ring Kiss Mint gum, instead of Mariko Takahashi appearing.

She played the heroine in the film 69 released in 2004 and started her acting career. In the same year, Ōta was in charge of the April–September quarter of NHK's language programme Russia-go Kaiwa. She won the "Best Teen Fashionista Award" at the MTV Student Voice Awards 2006. Ōta later moved her agency from Okazaki Models to Anoré in March 2010.

Personal life
On 11 January 2009, Ōta married Japanese actor Ryuhei Matsuda. Their first child, a daughter, was born on 4 July 2009. They divorced in December 2017.

Filmography

TV dramas

Films

Internet drama

Magazine covers

Photo albums

Advertisements

Participating works

References

External links
  

Japanese female models
Japanese actresses
Actors from Chiba Prefecture
Japanese people of Russian descent
1988 births
Living people
Models from Chiba Prefecture